Mandate Pictures was a full-service film production company acquired by Lionsgate in 2007.

History
In 2005, Mandate Pictures was officially formed when the Los Angeles–based Senator International completed a management buyout from German indie giant Senator Entertainment AG. Joe Drake, Brian Goldsmith and Nathan Kahane became the sole proprietors of Mandate Pictures. At the time, the company was helmed by President Joe Drake, chief financial officer Brian Goldsmith, and Nathan Kahane as the company's President of Motion Pictures, overseeing the daily creative operations of the new company. Mandate Pictures independently produced and financed feature films by leveraging international sales, while seeking out domestic distributors on a film by film basis.

On September 10, 2007, the partners sold Mandate Pictures to Lionsgate, and as part of that deal Kahane stayed on as President of Mandate Pictures while Mandate CEO Joe Drake became President of the Motion Picture Group and Co-Chief Operating Officer at Lionsgate. After the acquisition, Mandate operated as an independent brand under Drake and Kahane, releasing commercial and independent films worldwide while retaining the creative autonomy and capital to finance, develop, package and produce theatrical films.

In the spring of 2012, Drake and Kahane launched Good Universe, a new full-service motion picture financing, production and global sales company. The launch comes as the collaborators transition out of Lionsgate, opening its doors fully staffed and with films from the development slate at predecessor company Mandate Pictures. Good Universe will work with Lionsgate to complete a number of Mandate films and provide certain management and production services on a number of Mandate library properties.

Logo
The drummer girl in the logo is Georgia Rock, who later starred in the 2013 movie The Bling Ring.

Filmography

Senator International
Death to Smoochy (2002) (released by Warner Bros. Pictures and FilmFour)
Harold & Kumar Go to White Castle (2004) (released by New Line Cinema)
White Noise (2005) (released by Universal Pictures and Gold Circle Films)
Boogeyman (2005) (released by Screen Gems and Ghost House Pictures)
Lords of Dogtown (2005) (released by Columbia Pictures and Tristar Pictures)

Mandate Pictures

2000s
Stranger than Fiction (2006) (released by Columbia Pictures)
The Grudge 2 (2006) (released by Columbia Pictures and Ghost House Pictures)
The Messengers (2007) (released by Columbia Pictures, Screen Gems and Ghost House Pictures)
Rise: Blood Hunter (2007) (released by Samuel Goldwyn Films, Destination Films and Ghost House Pictures)
Sleuth (2007) (released by Sony Pictures Classics and Castle Rock Entertainment)
Juno (2007) (released by Fox Searchlight Pictures)
Mr. Magorium's Wonder Emporium (2007) (released by 20th Century Fox and Walden Media)
Harold & Kumar Escape from Guantanamo Bay (2008) (released by New Line Cinema)
The Strangers (2008) (released by Rogue Pictures and Intrepid Pictures)
Passengers (2008)  (released by TriStar Pictures)
Nick & Norah's Infinite Playlist (2008) (released by Columbia Pictures)
Horsemen (2009) (released by Lionsgate, Radar Pictures and Platinum Dunes)
Drag Me to Hell (2009) (released by Universal Pictures and Ghost House Pictures)
Whip It (2009) (released by Fox Searchlight Pictures)

2010s
Peacock (2010)
The Switch (2010) (released by Miramax Films)
50/50 (2011) (released by Summit Entertainment)
A Very Harold & Kumar 3D Christmas (2011) (released by Warner Bros. and New Line Cinema)
Young Adult (2011) (released by Paramount Pictures)
LOL (2012) (released by Lionsgate Films)
Seeking A Friend for the End of the World (2012) (released by Focus Features and Indian Paintbrush)
Hope Springs (2012) (co-released by Columbia Pictures and Metro-Goldwyn-Mayer Pictures)
This Is the End (2013) (released by Columbia Pictures)
Paradise (2013) (released by Image Entertainment)

References

External links
Mandate Pictures at IMDb

Mass media companies established in 2001
Mass media companies established in 2005
Mass media companies disestablished in 2013
Defunct American film studios
Former Lionsgate subsidiaries
International sales agents
Film production companies of the United States
Companies based in Los Angeles County, California
American independent film studios